Acacia cretacea, also known as chalky wattle, is a shrub belonging to the genus Acacia and the subgenus Phyllodineae that is endemic to South Australia.

Description
It has smooth grey or reddish-brown bark found on the on lower trunk. It blooms intermittently between July and January producing inflorescences containing 5 to 14 spherical coloured flower-heads.

Taxonomy
The species was first formally described by the botanists Bruce Maslin and D. J. E. Whibley in 1987 as part of the work The taxonomy of some South Australian Acacia section Phyllodineae species (Leguminosae: Mimosoideae) as published in the journal Nuytsia. It was reclassified as Racosperma cretaceum by Leslie Pedley in 2003 then transferred back to the genus Acacia in 2005.
The specific epithet is taken from the Latin word cretaceus which means chalk white in reference to the chalky coloured branchlets, flowers and seed pods. It belongs to the Acacia microbotrya group of wattles found on the Eye peninsula. It is also closely related to Acacia toondulya and similar in appearance to Acacia gillii.

Distribution
It is found on the southern and eastern sides of the Eyre Peninsula in South Australia on sandplains and gently undulating hills to the north of Cowell where it grows in red sandy soils as a part of mallee and low shrubland communities. The wattle is commonly associated with Eucalyptus incrassata, Melaleuca uncinata and Triodia irritans. The shrub also situated on roadsides and in adjacent farming land.

See also
 List of Acacia species

References

cretacea
Flora of South Australia
Taxa named by Bruce Maslin
Plants described in 1987